Augustus Hannibal Burbank (January 24, 1823 – June 27, 1895) was a 19th-century American physician. He was also treasurer of Yarmouth Aqueduct Company and an early president of North Yarmouth Academy.

Early life
Burbank was born in Poland, Maine, on January 24, 1823, the only son of physician Eleazer Burbank and Sophronia Ricker.

He graduated from Bowdoin College in 1843 and studied medicine at Harvard University, receiving his MD in 1847.

Career
Upon graduating, Burbank returned to Yarmouth, Maine, and entered general practice.

He was an early president of North Yarmouth Academy while Charles Chesley Springer was its principal. The two became close friends, which resulted in their families sharing the same burial plot. He was also a treasurer of Yarmouth Aqueduct Company.

Personal life

On 25 November 1851, Burbank married Elizabeth Richardson Banks. They had two children: Annie (1852–1901) and Elizabeth (born 1873), who died in infancy. The maternal Elizabeth died in 1869, aged about 45.

On 16 December 1871, Burbank married Alice Noyes Thompson, with whom he had three children: Hugh Eleazer, Marjorie and Maurice Augustus.

He was a member of Yarmouth's First Parish Congregational Church and, professionally, the Maine Medical Association.

Death
Burbank died of heart disease on June 27, 1895, aged 72. Three years later, Alice remarried, to Charles Torrey. He died in 1918 while they were living in Plymouth, Massachusetts, after which Alice returned to Yarmouth, where she died in 1938, aged about 90. Burbank, his two wives and three of his children are interred in the same plot in Yarmouth's Riverside Cemetery, a plot also shared with the family of Charles Chesley Springer. Maurice had moved to Vancouver, where he died in 1969, aged 89. He was buried in the city's Mountain View Cemetery.

References

1823 births
1895 deaths
People from Poland, Maine
People from North Yarmouth, Maine
People from Yarmouth, Maine
Physicians from Maine
19th-century American physicians
North Yarmouth Academy alumni
Bowdoin College alumni
Harvard Medical School alumni
Burials in Maine